Brent Lee (born 1964, Wynyard, Saskatchewan) is a Canadian composer and professor of Music Composition at the University of Windsor.  Growing up, he studied guitar and saxophone.  He received a Bachelor's (1986) and Master's (1990) degree in Music Composition from McGill University in Montreal.  Brent showed interest in both computer and electroacoustic music.  While still a student, he was awarded several composition prizes through CAPAC and SOCAN, and was one of six young composers to receive a Residency Prize at the Bourges International Electroacoustic Music Festival in 1988.

Following his studies in Montreal, Lee had residencies in the Netherlands, Bourges and at the Banff Centre, before settlingin Calgary in 1990.  There, he taught at the Mount Royal College Conservatory, as well as working with New Works Calgary, Strictly Plutonic and Modus Vivendi ensembles. He was named an associate composer of the Canadian Music Centre in 1991.

Brent completed a doctoral degree in composition at the University of British Columbia, studying composition with Keith Hamel and Steven Chatman. Lee also studied orchestration with Nikolai Korndorf in Vancouver.  Brent accepted a position at the University of Windsor in 2002, after a two-year post-doctoral fellowship at UBC.

While in Windsor, Brent was named the first Composer-in-Residence with the Windsor Symphony Orchestra, a position which he held from, 2003-2006.  Dr. Lee has also been heavily involved in the Windsor Canadian Music Festival, which is a celebration of new Canadian music hosted by the Windsor Symphony, and the University of Windsor School of Music.

Brent recently started the Noiseborder Ensemble, which is an experimental new music group at the University of Windsor.

References

External links
 Windsor Symphony Orchestra
 Canadian Music Centre
 Noiseborder Official Website
 U of W School of Music

Canadian composers
Canadian male composers
Academic staff of University of Windsor
McGill University School of Music alumni
University of British Columbia alumni
Canadian music academics
Musicians from Saskatchewan
1964 births
Living people
People from Wynyard, Saskatchewan